Cristián Caro Cordero (born 16 February 1943) is a Chilean prelate of the Catholic Church who was Archbishop of Puerto Montt from 2001 to June 2018.

Biography 
He was ordained a priest by Cardinal Raúl Silva Henríquez on 23 December 1973. On 13 March 1991, Pope John Paul II named him titular bishop of Arcavica and Auxiliary Bishop of Santiago. He received his episcopal consecration from Carlos Oviedo Cavada on 14 April. John Paul appointed him Archbishop of Puerto Montt on 27 February 2001. 

On 18 May 2018, Caro submitted his resignation to Pope Francis, as did all the Chilean bishops at the conclusion of a three-day meeting in Rome. On 11 June 2018, Pope Francis accepted his resignation as archbishop. Though Caro was not named in connection with the ongoing controversy surrounding clerical sexual abuse in Chile, Francis replaced him with an Apostolic Administrator just as he did those bishops whose resignations he accepted because of their involvement. He was accused a few days later of having failed to handle reports of sexual abuse by a priest properly, but he said appropriate procedures had been followed.

See also 
Catholic Church in Chile
Catholic sexual abuse cases in Chile

References 

1943 births
Living people
21st-century Roman Catholic archbishops in Chile
Roman Catholic archbishops of Puerto Montt
Roman Catholic bishops of Santiago de Chile